Napoleonaea egertonii is a species of woody plant in the family Lecythidaceae. It is found in Cameroon, Gabon, and Nigeria. Its natural habitat is subtropical or tropical moist lowland forests. It is threatened by habitat loss.

References

egertonii
Flora of Cameroon
Flora of Gabon
Flora of Nigeria
Vulnerable flora of Africa
Taxonomy articles created by Polbot